Sengstacke is a surname. Notable people with the surname include:

John H. Sengstacke (1912–1997), American newspaper publisher
Robert A. Sengstacke (1943–2017), American photojournalist

See also
Robert Sengstacke Abbott (1870–1940), American lawyer, newspaper publisher, and editor